Center Parkway station may refer to:

 Center Parkway station (Sacramento), a light rail station in Sacramento, California
 Center Parkway/Washington station, a light rail station in Tempe, Arizona
 Richmond Parkway Transit Center, a bus terminal and park and ride lot in Richmond, California

See also 
 List of Parkway railway stations in Britain